Eshkaftan (also Romanized as Eshkaftān and Ashkaftān; also known as Eshgaftān, Īskatun, and Shekaftān) is a village in Amirabad Rural District, Muchesh District, Kamyaran County, Kurdistan Province, Iran. At the 2006 census, its population was 192, in 55 families. The village is populated by Kurds.

References 

Towns and villages in Kamyaran County
Kurdish settlements in Kurdistan Province